Hongwu (23 January 1368 – 5 February 1399) was the era name of the Hongwu Emperor during his reign, and was also the Ming dynasty's first era name.

On 23 January 1368 (Wu 2, 4th day of the 1st month), Zhu Yuanzhang proclaimed himself emperor of the Ming dynasty in Yingtian Prefecture with the era name "Hongwu". During the Hongwu period, there was no war in the country, and the society quickly recovered from the war in the late Yuan dynasty. The population increased rapidly, and the economy developed rapidly. It was known in historiography as the "Reign of Hongwu" (洪武之治).

The emperors only used one era name during their reigns since the Hongwu Emperor began to form a practise (Emperor Yingzong of Ming had two era names because of his abdication and later restoration, and the rest used one era name). It was known as the yī shì yī yuán zhì (一世一元制; lit. "one-era-name-for-a-lifetime system").

On 24 June 1398 (Hongwu 31, 10th day of the 5th leap month), the Hongwu Emperor died. On 30 June (16th day of the 5th leap month), Imperial Grandson-heir Zhu Yunwen ascended to the throne as the Jianwen Emperor. The era was changed to Jianwen in the following year.

On 18 July 1402 (Jianwen 4, 18th day of the 6th month), the Yongle Emperor, who usurped the throne through the Jingnan campaign, abolished the Jianwen era name and renamed it "Hongwu 35" (洪武三十五年, "the thirty-fifth year of the Hongwu era"). The era was changed to Yongle in the following year. According to Xia Xie (夏燮)'s Ming Tongjian (明通鑑), since Zhu Di started his rebellion at Beijing in 1399 (Jianwen 1), he began restoring the Hongwu era name in his conquest areas, and after the Jingnan campaign, he ordered the whole country to reuse the Hongwu era name.

Change of era
 23 January 1368 (Wu 2, 4th day of the 1st month): The era was changed to Hongwu 1 (洪武元年, "the first year of the Hongwu era").
 6 February 1399 (Hongwu 32, 1st day of the 1st month): The era was changed to Jianwen 1 (建文元年, "the first year of the Jianwen era").
 30 July 1402 (Jianwen 4, 18th day of the 6th month): The Jianwen era name was discontinued, and the era was changed to Hongwu 35.
 23 January 1403 (Hongwu 36, 1st day of the 1st month): The era was changed to Yongle 1 (永樂元年, "the first year of the Yongle era").

Comparison table

Other regime era names that existed during the same period
 China
 Yuan dynasty/Northern Yuan
 Zhizheng (至正; 1341–1370): era name of Toghon Temür (Emperor Shun of Yuan)
 Xuanguang (宣光; 1371–1379): era name of Biligtü Khan Ayushiridara (Emperor Zhaozong of Yuan)
 Tianyuan (天元; 1379–1388): era name of Uskhal Khan Tögüs Temür (Prince of Yi)
 Ming Xia
 Kaixi (開熙; 1367–1371): era name of Ming Sheng (明昇)
 Ming period
 Tianding (天定; 1386): era name of Peng Yulin (彭玉琳)
 Longfeng (龍鳳; 1397): era name of Tian Jiucheng (田九成)
 Vietnam
 Trần dynasty
 Đại Trị (大治; 1358–1369): era name of Trần Dụ Tông
 Đại Định (大定; 1369–1370): era name of Dương Nhật Lễ
 Thiệu Khánh (紹慶; 1370–1372): era name of Trần Nghệ Tông
 Long Khánh (隆慶; 1373–1377): era name of Trần Duệ Tông
 Xương Phù (昌符; 1377–1388): era name of Trần Phế Đế
 Quang Thái (光泰; 1388–1398): era name of Trần Thuận Tông
 Kiến Tân (建新; 1398–1400): era name of Trần Thiếu Đế
Japan
 Southern Court
 Shōhei (正平; 1346–1370): era name of Emperor Go-Murakami and Emperor Chōkei
 Kentoku (建徳; 1370–1372): era name of Emperor Chōkei
 Bunchū (文中; 1372–1375): era name of Emperor Chōkei
 Tenju (天授; 1375–1381): era name of Emperor Chōkei
 Kōwa (弘和; 1381–1384): era name of Emperor Chōkei and Emperor Go-Kameyama
 Genchū (元中; 1384–1392): era name of Emperor Go-Kameyama
 Northern Court
 Jōji (貞治; 1362–1368): era name of Emperor Go-Kōgon
 Ōan (応安; 1368–1375): era name of Emperor Go-Kōgon and Emperor Go-En'yū
 Eiwa (永和; 1375–1379): era name of Emperor Go-En'yū
 Kōryaku (康暦; 1379–1381): era name of Emperor Go-En'yū
 Eitoku (永徳; 1381–1384): era name of Emperor Go-En'yū and Emperor Go-Komatsu
 Shitoku (至徳; 1384–1387): era name of Emperor Go-Komatsu
 Kakei (嘉慶; 1387–1389): era name of Emperor Go-Komatsu
 Kōō (康応; 1389–1390): era name of Emperor Go-Komatsu
 Meitoku (明徳; 1390–1394): era name of Emperor Go-Komatsu
 Post-Meitoku unification
 Ōei (応永; 1394–1428): era name of Emperor Go-Komatsu and Emperor Shōkō

See also
 List of Chinese era names
 List of Ming dynasty era names

References

Further reading

Ming dynasty eras